Susanna Attili (born 7 March 1973) is an Italian former professional tennis player.

In the early 1990s, Attili competed at WTA Tour level as a doubles specialist and reached a best doubles ranking of 131 in the world. She featured in the main draw of the 1994 US Open, with regular partner Elena Savoldi.

Attili is married to former ATP Tour player Francesco Cinà, who coached Roberta Vinci to the 2015 US Open final.

ITF finals

Doubles: 5 (1–4)

References

External links
 
 

1973 births
Living people
Italian female tennis players
20th-century Italian women